Dylan John Hughes (born 23 January 1985) is a Canadian-born Welsh former professional footballer. He was an attacking all-rounder, and could play in any position in the forward. Hughes is a players agent and FIFA match-agent licensed through Canada Soccer.

Football career
Hughes signed for Newcastle United Academy after a successful trial at the young age of 16. Three years later he moved to Germany and signed a professional contract with 1. FC Kaiserslautern. After two years in Kaiserslautern he joined SSV Jahn Regensburg. He signed with Dutch Eredivisie RKC Waalwijk in April 2006, signing a two-year deal, and went in mid-2007 on loan to VVV-Venlo, before he returned in the summer of 2007. He left the Netherlands in summer 2008 and joined Greek Beta Ethniki club APS Makedonikos Neapoli and played in 25 games for the club. He was transferred to PAS Lamia 1964 where he played 1 season. In August 2010, he signed a contract with FT Starnberg 09, as player coach before he retired in May 2012 due to a knee injury.

International career
Hughes was Welsh youth international in U-17 and U-21 level, he was in the squad of Welsh U-16 team at 2001 UEFA European Under-16 Football Championship qualifying. Hughes played his only match for Wales U-21 against Latvia U-21 August 23, 2004, friendly. He also played for Canada U-20 team between October 2003 and December 2004, all friendly. Hughes also included in preliminary squad of 2005 CONCACAF U20 Tournament.

Coaching career 
Hughes received his UEFA B level coaching certificate through the Welsh FA. He worked during his coaching career by FT Starnberg, 2010 until 2012 and as Head coach of the c-youth from TSV 1860 München. In December 2012, he was named as the new Director of Sport by SC Fürstenfeldbruck.

References

1985 births
Soccer players from Vancouver
Living people
Association football forwards
Canadian soccer players
Welsh footballers
Wales under-21 international footballers
Expatriate footballers in England
Expatriate footballers in Germany
Expatriate footballers in the Netherlands
Expatriate footballers in Greece
Newcastle United F.C. players
1. FC Kaiserslautern II players
SSV Jahn Regensburg players
RKC Waalwijk players
VVV-Venlo players
Canada men's youth international soccer players
Wales youth international footballers
Canadian expatriate soccer players
Canadian expatriate sportspeople in England